The 2019-20 Alabama–Huntsville Chargers men's ice hockey season was the 35th season of play for the program, the 27th at the Division I level and the 7th in the WCHA conference. The Chargers represented the University of Alabama Huntsville and were coached by Mike Corbett, in his 7th season.

After the season, financial constraints due in part to the coronavirus pandemic caused UAH to suspend its ice hockey program as well as both men's and women's tennis. On May 25, 2020, the university announced the program would be reinstated if the community could raise $750,000 by Friday, May 29. Pledges from alumni reduced the amount needed from the general public to $500,000. On May 29, fundraising efforts surpassed $500,000, and shortly afterwards the university confirmed the program would be restored for the 2020-2021 season.

Departures

Recruiting

Roster
As of August 1, 2019.

Standings

Schedule and Results

|-
!colspan=12 style=";" | Regular Season

Scoring Statistics

Goaltending statistics

Rankings

References

Alabama–Huntsville Chargers men's ice hockey seasons
Alabama–Huntsville Chargers
Alabama–Huntsville Chargers
2019 in sports in Alabama
2020 in sports in Alabama